José Amadeu dos Santos Mendes, known as Amadeu (born 28 January 1995) is a Portuguese footballer who plays for Paredes as a defender.

Football career
On 16 November 2014, Amadeu made his professional debut with Freamunde in a 2014–15 Segunda Liga match against Santa Clara.

References

External links

Stats and profile at LPFP 

1995 births
People from Paredes, Portugal
Living people
Portuguese footballers
Association football defenders
Liga Portugal 2 players
S.C. Freamunde players
U.S.C. Paredes players
S.C. Espinho players
Gondomar S.C. players
Sportspeople from Porto District